Marcus Wendel Valle da Silva (born 28 September 1997), commonly known as Wendel, is a Brazilian footballer who plays for Russian club Zenit Saint Petersburg. He plays as a central midfielder, an attacking midfielder or a left midfielder.

Club career

Fluminense
Wendel started his professional career in Tigres do Brasil's youth team.

Sporting CP

He signed a contract with Sporting Clube de Portugal in January 2018, valid until 2023, with a termination clause, with Fluminense receiving 10% of the money. Wendel initially had difficulty adapting to the tempo and tactics of European football which led to low playing time during the early campaign. However, after the appointment of Marcel Keizer as manager of the club, Wendel became a usual starter. In the beginning of December, Wendel suffered a left knee sprain which sidelined him for 2 months.

Zenit Saint Petersburg
On 6 October 2020, Wendel joined Russian club Zenit Saint Petersburg on a five-year contract. On 21 July 2022, Wendel extended his contract with Zenit until 2027. On 11 September 2022, Wendel scored the first hat-trick of his career in a 8–0 victory against FC Orenburg.

Career statistics

Honours

Sporting
Primeira Liga: 2020–21
Taça de Portugal: 2018–19
Taça da Liga: 2018–19

Zenit Saint Petersburg
Russian Premier League: 2020–21, 2021–22
Russian Super Cup: 2021, 2022

References

1997 births
Living people
Brazilian footballers
Association football midfielders
Campeonato Brasileiro Série A players
Primeira Liga players
Russian Premier League players
Fluminense FC players
Sporting CP footballers
FC Zenit Saint Petersburg players
Brazil youth international footballers
Brazilian expatriate footballers
Brazilian expatriate sportspeople in Portugal
Brazilian expatriate sportspeople in Russia
Expatriate footballers in Portugal
Expatriate footballers in Russia
People from Duque de Caxias, Rio de Janeiro
Sportspeople from Rio de Janeiro (state)